NGC 2423-3 is a red giant star approximately 2498 light-years away in the constellation of Puppis.  The star is part of the NGC 2423 open cluster (hence the name NGC 2423-3).  The star has an apparent magnitude of nine and an absolute magnitude of zero, with a mass of 2.4 times the Sun.  As of 2007, it has been confirmed that an extrasolar planet orbits the star.

Planetary system 

NGC 2423-3 b is an exoplanet 10.6 times more massive than Jupiter, even more massive than Pi Mensae b, which has mass about 10.3 times Jupiter. Only the minimum mass is known since the orbital inclination is not known, so it is likely to be a brown dwarf instead, like NGC 4349-127 b. The planet orbits at 10.2 μpc, taking 1.956 years to orbit eccentrically around the star. Its eccentricity is about the same as Mercury, but less than Pluto. The planet has semi-amplitude of 71.5 m/s since if 10.6  planet orbits at 2.1 AU from 2.4 MS star.

This planet was discovered by Chad Lovis and Michel Mayor in July 2007. Lovis had also found three Neptune-mass planets orbiting HD 69830 in May 2006, also in Puppis.

See also 
 NGC 4349-127
 PSR B1620-26

References

External links 
 

Puppis
M-type giants
BD-13 2130
Planetary systems with one confirmed planet